The 2013–14 New Mexico State Aggies men's basketball team represented New Mexico State University during the 2013–14 NCAA Division I men's basketball season. The Aggies, led by seventh year head coach Marvin Menzies, played their home games at the Pan American Center and were members of the Western Athletic Conference. They finished the season 26–10, 12–4 in WAC play to finish in second place. They were champions of the WAC tournament to earn an automatic bid to the NCAA tournament. In their 21st NCAA Tournament appearance, they lost in the second round to San Diego State.

Previous season 
The Aggies finished the season 24–11, 14–4 in WAC play to finish in third place.

Departures

Incoming Transfers

2013 Recruiting Class

Roster

Schedule

|-
!colspan=9 style=| Exhibition

|-
!colspan=9 style=|  Regular season

|-
!colspan=9 style=| WAC tournament

|-
!colspan=9 style=| 2014 NCAA Division I men's basketball tournament

References

New Mexico State Aggies men's basketball seasons
New Mexico State
New Mexico State
Aggies
Aggies